Manu Farrarons (born 1967) is a French-born Polynesian tattoo artist. Farrarons' art is a mix of Polynesian styles and designs, mostly Tahitian and Marquesan, which he mixes with Māori and Hawaiian influences.

Biography
Born in 1967 in Cholet (France), of a painter mother and tattoo artist father, he spent his childhood in Tahiti and was immersed in Polynesian life and culture. At an early age he started drawing Tahitian and Marquesan designs.

After finishing high school, he studied to become a school teacher. Even during his time as a school teacher, he increased his knowledge of Polynesian designs by researching them in Tahiti and Hawaii, where he had access to anthropological archives stored at Bishop Museum of Honolulu.

Manu has been tattooing professionally since 1991, after he left his job as a school teacher in order to fulfill his passion. His father opened the first professional tattoo shop in Tahiti, which he owned until he passed it down to Manu. He started tattooing when he was age 15. He took over his father’s tattoo shop in Papeete, Tahiti, and renamed it "Mana’o Tattoo". In the Tahitian language the word "Mana’o" means "idea, knowledge or thought".

Prizes and honors
2018 - Featured in December issue of Tattoo Magazine USA
2016 - Best of Day - NZ Tattoo & Art Festival, Taranaki, New Zealand
2016 - Best Tribal artist - Art Gathering LA, Long Beach CA
2015 - Best Tribal Artist - INK N IRON, Long Beach CA
2015 - Air Tahiti Nui ambassador
2013 - 1st Place open category Polynesia Tatau Convention, Tahiti
2011 - Best Tribal Artist - INK & IRON, Long Beach CA
2010 - 2nd Best Polynesian (male) Sydney Tattoo Expo, Australia
2010 - 2nd Best Polynesian (female) Sydney Tattoo Expo, Australia
2008 - Best Tribal Artist - INK & IRON, Long Beach CA
2005 - Best of day, Tattoonesia convention, Moorea, French Polynesia

Gallery

References

Allen, Tricia (2010). The Polynesian Tattoo Today, p. 10, 19, 29, 58, 59, 63, 92, 244, 245. Mutual Publishing, Hawai'i. .

External links
Official website.

French artists
Tattoo artists
People from Tahiti
Polynesian culture
Tiki culture
Living people
1967 births